The 1993 Mid-Continent Conference Tournament took place from May 20 through 23. The top six regular season finishers of the league's nine teams met in the double-elimination tournament held in Chicago, Illinois.  won the tournament for the second time.

Format and seeding
The top six teams advanced to the tournament.

Tournament
Bracket to be included

Game-by-game results

All-Tournament Team

Tournament Most Valuable Player
Jody Brown of UIC was named Tournament MVP.

References

Tournament
Summit League Baseball Tournament
Mid-Continent Conference baseball tournament
Mid-Continent Conference baseball tournament